Masahiro Motoki (本木 雅弘 Motoki Masahiro, born December 21, 1965) is a Japanese actor. He portrayed protagonist Daigo Kobayashi in Departures, which won the 81st Academy Awards for Best Foreign Language Film. His performance earned him the Award for Best Actor at the 2009 Asia Pacific Screen Awards, at the 3rd Asian Film Awards and at the 32nd Japan Academy Prize.

Career
The band made its debut in 1982 under the management of Johnny & Associates and was popular for a good part of the 1980s.

After the band broke up Motoki turned to acting. His first main role in a film was as a Zen monk in the comedy  directed by Masayuki Suo. Motoki also starred in Suo's next film, which practically introduced him to audiences outside Japan. He then worked with directors such as Takashi Miike and Shinya Tsukamoto.

Motoki's breakthrough to international fame came with the 2008 film  directed by Yōjirō Takita, in which he plays a cellist turned mortician. The film received the Best Foreign Language Film award at the 81st Academy Awards, as well as six acting awards for Motoki. The film project started from an idea of Motoki's after he read a book written by a professional mortician.

Family
He married essayist and musician Yayako Uchida, the daughter of actress Kirin Kiki and rock'n roll singer Yuya Uchida, in 1995. As a mukoyōshi, he took his wife's surname, which is thus his legal surname. The couple have three children.

Filmography

Film
 (1982)
 (1982)
 (1983)
 (1985)
 (1989)
 (1989)
 (1989)
 (1989)
 (1990)
 (1991)
 (1991)
 (1992)
 (1993)
 (1993)
 (1994)
 (1994)
 (1995)
 (1996)
 (1996)
 (1997)
 (1998)
 (1999)
 (2003)
 (2003)
 (2006) (voice only)
 (2007)
 (2008)
 (2015)
 (2015) - Emperor Hirohito
 (2016) - Sachio Kinugasa
The Works and Days (of Tayoko Shiojiri in the Shiotani Basin) (2020)

Television
 (1981)
 (1987)
 (1987)
 (1987)
 (1988)
 (1990)
 (1991) - Chigusa Tadaaki
 (1991)
 (1992)
 (1992)
 (1993)
 (1993)
 (1994)
 (1995)
 (1996)
 (1998) - Tokugawa Yoshinobu
 (1999)
 (2000)
 (2000)
 (2001)
 (2001) - Prince Shōtoku
 (2001)
 (2002)
 (2005)
 (2005) - Natsume Sōseki
 (2005)
 (2009–11) - Akiyama Saneyuki
Man of Destiny (2012) - Ryōta Yuminari
Giri/Haji (2019)
Kirin ga Kuru (2020) - Saitō Dōsan
Ryūkō Kanbō (2021)

Dubbing
Life of Pi (Pi Patel (Irrfan Khan))

References

External links

 
|-
! colspan="3" style="background: #DAA520;" | Asian Film Awards
|-

1965 births
Japanese male actors
Johnny & Associates
Living people
Musicians from Saitama Prefecture
Taiga drama lead actors
Best Actor Asian Film Award winners
Asia Pacific Screen Award winners